Grant Goodeve (born July 6, 1952) is an American actor and television host. He is best known for his role as David Bradford, the eldest son on ABC television's Eight Is Enough from 1977 to 1981; he sang the theme song for the show, as well. More recent work includes stints on the Home & Garden Television cable channel, and voice roles such as the Engineer in the multiplayer video game Team Fortress 2, and Wolf O'Donnell in Star Fox: Assault.

Hollywood
Goodeve was born in Middlebury, Connecticut, and moved to Los Angeles, California, in 1975. His sister is the writer Thyrza Nichols Goodeve.

His earliest role was on a fifth-season episode of Emergency!  After a February 1977 screen test, he signed on as a cast member of  Eight Is Enough, taking over a role played in the series' pilot episode by Mark Hamill.

When Eight Is Enough ended in 1981, Goodeve appeared in guest roles in series such as The Love Boat, T. J. Hooker, Dynasty, and Fantasy Island, among others. In 1983, he played a role in the  television pilot The Night Watchman. In the summer of 1984, Goodeve hosted the syndicated program Solid Gold Hits. In 1985–86, he played Michael James "Woody" Woodward on the ABC soap opera One Life to Live. In 1984 he co-starred in the made-for-TV movie Pigs vs. Freaks (a.k.a. Off Sides (Pigs vs. Freaks)). He also made a number of appearances as a celebrity guest contestant on the Pyramid game shows in the late 1970s and 1980s.

He reprised his Eight Is Enough role in two reunion movies during the late 1980s, and also appeared in several episodes of Murder, She Wrote. As the 1990s came to a close, he made an appearance on The WB's hit series 7th Heaven as Captain Jack Smith. In 2000, Goodeve appeared as the host of Word Pictures' production Proving the Bible through Archeology.

Pacific Northwest
Goodeve moved to the Pacific Northwest in 1989 with his wife and three children. Soon after, he began appearing in the recurring role of Rick Pedersen, an ill-fated bush pilot, on the CBS series Northern Exposure. He also began contributing to KING-TV's Evening Magazine, and began hosting that station's travel show Northwest Backroads in 1998.  As of 2014, Grant had hosted it for 16 years.

From 2000 to 2004, he hosted If Walls Could Talk and Homes of Our Heritage on Home & Garden Television.  He has worked as a voice actor for several video games, including the role of Wolf O'Donnell in Star Fox: Assault, the Engineer in Team Fortress 2, and various voices for F.E.A.R.. He also lent his singing voice to Bob Rivers' Twisted Christmas series of holiday CDs.

He is active in his Presbyterian church in Seattle, engaging part-time in an itinerant music ministry in the region.

In 2006, Goodeve appeared as George Bailey in Seattle's Taproot Theatre Company's production of  It's a Wonderful Life: A Live Radio Play. He returned to the Taproot stage in 2008's production of  The Christmas Foundling as Old Jake.

Goodeve also appears in the Amtrak Cascades safety video.

Filmography

TV series

Films

Video games

Discography
 The Wonder of It All (1996)

References

External links
 
 [ Grant Goodeve] at Allmusic

Living people
Taft School alumni
Male actors from Connecticut
American Presbyterians
American male television actors
American male video game actors
American male voice actors
People from Middlebury, Connecticut
People from Redmond, Washington
1952 births
Television personalities from Connecticut